The men's long jump event at the 2007 Summer Universiade was held on 11–12 August.

Medalists

Results

Qualification
Qualification: 7.85 m (Q) or at least 12 best (q) qualified for the final.

Final

References
Results
Final results

Long
2007